Gigantotheca is a genus of hydrozoans belonging to the family Sertulariidae.

The species of this genus are found in the coasts of New Zealand.

Species:

Gigantotheca maxima 
Gigantotheca raukumarai

References

Sertulariidae
Medusozoa genera

Hydrozoan genera